The Lipcani-Rădăuți Bridge is a road bridge over Prut and a checkpoint between Moldova and Romania.

History
The Rădăuți-Lipcani bridge was built up in 1937 and blasted up in 1941 by retreating Red Army, during the German-led invasion of the Soviet Union. It was rebuilt but destroyed again in 1944 during bombing in World War II. In 2000, the European Commission earmarked 11 million euros to Moldova and Romania to reconstruct the bridge. The construction was completed in 2005.

The bridge and the border checkpoint between Romania and Moldova were re-unveiled on February 15, 2010. The inauguration ribbon was cut by Prime Minister Vlad Filat, Romanian Administration and Interior Minister Vasile Blaga and the head of the Delegation of the European Union to Moldova, Dirk Schuebel. Filat noted that after 66 years, Moldovan citizens have again the possibility of crossing the bridge. Besides Filat, Moldova was represented at the event by Interior Minister Victor Catan, the head of the Customs Service Tudor Balițchi and the head of the Border Guard Service Alexei Roibu and Romania by the head of the Suceava County Council, Gheorghe Flutur, the head of the Botoşani County Council, Mihai Țîbuleac, and the prefect of Botoșani County, Cristian Roman.

The new checkpoint at Lipcani-Rădăuți Prut will facilitate the implementation of the agreement on small-scale cross-border trade signed by the two states at the end of 2009. There are another seven Moldova–Romania border crossings.

See also
 Moldovan–Romanian relations
 List of bridges in Moldova
 List of bridges in Romania

External links
 Customs Service of the Republic of Moldova
 THE REPUBLIC OF MOLDOVA BETWEEN NEUTRALITY AND NORMALITY 15 February 2010

Notes

Road bridges
Bridges in Moldova
Bridges in Romania
Bridges completed in 1937
Bridges over the Prut
Moldova–Romania border crossings
Romania–Soviet Union relations
Lipcani
Buildings and structures in Botoșani County
Road bridges in Europe